Marai Al Awaji (born 31 July 1973) is a Saudi professional football referee. He has been a full international for FIFA since 2010. He refereed some matches in AFC Champions League. He was a referee during the 2010 Polish Super Cup.

References 

1973 births
Living people
Saudi Arabian football referees